A significant tornado outbreak sequence took place on March 1, 1983 in South Central Los Angeles (today known as South Los Angeles). The tornado commenced around 7:40 AM during commute time in the Los Angeles Neighborhood of South Park. The tornado traveled north towards USC, narrowly missing the campus, and continued northbound towards iconic Los Angeles buildings. The tornado dissipated at the Los Angeles Convention Center, which took heavy damage and served as a line of defense for some skyscrapers.

Summary
The meteorological event of March 1, 1983, was a tornado with a vortex
rotating cyclonically (counterclockwise) with vortex wind speeds probably in excess of 113 mph. Its lifetime was about 20 to 25 minutes,
from about 7:40 to 8:05 a.m. The associated damage is assessed at F2 on
the Fujita scale.
Given the weather data available at the time, particularly the radar
reports of cloud tops at only 5,500 m, a tornado forecast or warning
would have been difficult to justify on the basis of our current understanding of tornadoes.

At least 30 people were injured, and 150 buildings were damaged. While local news media state that nine people were killed, official records list no fatalities for this tornado.

See also
List of North American tornadoes and tornado outbreaks
South Los Angeles
Los Angeles Convention Center

References

External links

F2 tornadoes
1983 meteorology
1983 in California
1983 natural disasters in the United States
March 1983 events in the United States
Tornadoes in California
Tornadoes of 1983